Pierre and Jean (French: Pierre et Jean) is a 1943 French drama film directed by André Cayatte and starring Renée Saint-Cyr, Noël Roquevert and Jacques Dumesnil. It is based on the novel Pierre and Jean by Guy de Maupassant.

The film's sets were designed by the art director Andrej Andrejew.

Cast
 Renée Saint-Cyr as Alice 
 Noël Roquevert as Marcel Roland 
 Jacques Dumesnil as Le docteur Henri Marchat 
 Gilbert Gil as Pierre Roland 
 Bernard Lancret as Jean Roland 
 Solange Delporte as Louise Roland 
 René Génin as Pascaud 
 Paul Barge as Le garçon de la guinguette 
 Dany Bill as Pierre Roland enfant 
 Georges Chamarat as Carbonnel 
 Raymond Raynal as Le boxeur  
 Huguette Vivier as Loulou Vertu

References

Bibliography 
 Crisp, C.G. The Classic French Cinema, 1930-1960. Indiana University Press, 1993.

External links 
 

1943 films
French drama films
1940s French-language films
Films directed by André Cayatte
Films based on French novels
Films based on works by Guy de Maupassant
French black-and-white films
1943 drama films
Continental Films films
1940s French films